Cabrières-d'Avignon is a commune in the Vaucluse department in the Provence-Alpes-Côte d'Azur region in southeastern France.

History
The Château and the village were the scene of the massacre in 1545 of about 700 Vaudois, or Waldensians—a reformist group declared heretical by the Catholic church. Men, women, and children were tortured and killed. The events are known as the Massacre of Mérindol, after the campaign which began in nearby Mérindol and resulted in the destruction of between 22 and 28 villages.

See also
Communes of the Vaucluse department

References

Communes of Vaucluse